Isaac Chapman Bates (January 23, 1779March 16, 1845) was an American politician from Massachusetts.

He was born in Granville, Massachusetts, and graduated from Yale College in 1802. He practiced law in Northampton, Massachusetts, in 1808.

Political career

Massachusetts House of Representatives
He was a member of the Massachusetts House of Representatives (1808–1809).

United States House of Representatives
Bates was elected to the United States House of Representatives (March 4, 1827 – March 3, 1835), where he was an Anti-Jacksonian.  He was chairman of the U.S. House Committee on Military Pensions in the Twenty-first Congress.  He declined to be a candidate for renomination in 1834.

United States Senate
He was elected as a Whig to the United States Senate to fill the vacancy in the term ending March 3, 1841, caused by the resignation of John Davis and on the same day elected for the term commencing March 4, 1841, and served from January 13, 1841, until his death.  He was chairman of the U.S. Senate Committee on Pensions (Twenty-seventh and Twenty-eighth Congresses); interment in Bridge Street Cemetery, Northampton, Massachusetts.

See also
List of United States Congress members who died in office (1790–1899)

Sources and external links

"Memoir of Hon. I.C. Bates, Late United States Senator from Massachusetts." American Whig Review 3 (February 1846): 186–192.

1779 births
1845 deaths
Members of the Massachusetts House of Representatives
United States senators from Massachusetts
Yale College alumni
Massachusetts Federalists
Massachusetts Whigs
19th-century American politicians
Whig Party United States senators
National Republican Party members of the United States House of Representatives from Massachusetts
People from Granville, Massachusetts